George Boahen Oduro is a Ghanaian politician and member of the Seventh Parliament of the Fourth Republic of Ghana representing the New Edubease Constituency in the Ashanti Region on the ticket of the New Patriotic Party. He was the Deputy Minister for Food and Agriculture.

Early life and education 
George Oduro was born on October 10, 1965, he hails from Atobiase in the  Ashanti Region. He had his Bachelor of Science  degree in Operations and Project Management from Ghana Institute of Management and Public Administration (GIMPA) in 2013.  In 2015, he was awarded  a Masters In Business Administrations(MBA) in International Trade from the Analt University.

Personal life 
Oduro is a Christian.

Career 
Oduro was the Director of Operations/Project of  Cedar Seal Company Limited in Accra.

Politics 
He is a member of New Patriotic Party and was the former Member of Parliament (MP) for New Edubease Constituency.

Philanthropy 
In June 2019, he presented motorcycles to about 8 circuit supervisors of GES.

In December 2020, he donated sewing machines to about 40 apprentices in his constituency.

References

Ghanaian MPs 2017–2021
1955 births
Living people
New Patriotic Party politicians
Ghana Institute of Management and Public Administration alumni